Mark Goodier (born 9 June 1961) is a British radio disc jockey best known for his time on BBC Radio 1 between 1987 and 2002. He had two spells presenting the station's Top 40 singles chart, from 1990 to 1992 and from 1995 until 2002. He also had a stint on Radio 1 Breakfast during 1993. He currently presents the mid-morning show between 10am and 1pm on Greatest Hits Radio.

Goodier has also presented shows on BBC Radio 2, Classic FM, Smooth Radio and Real Radio, and appeared on BBC television as a recurring presenter of Top of the Pops between 1988 and 1996.

Goodier currently presents a morning show on Greatest Hits Radio England at 10am – 1pm (Mon - Fri) and specialist programmes The Smash Hits Chart Show (Sundays 5pm - 7pm) on Greatest Hits Radio England and Scotland.  From 30 March 2020, Mark's morning show is simulcasted across England and Scotland from 10am - 1pm. On 17 January 2023, Goodier announced that he will be replaced on weekday mornings by Ken Bruce, who is joining the station from BBC Radio 2. Bruce announced his departure from Radio 2 on the same day. Goodier will move to weekend mornings in April, replacing Pat Sharp who has left the station.

Early life and career
Goodier was born in Salisbury, Southern Rhodesia. His family moved to Llanfairfechan, Wales shortly after he was born, eventually settling in Edinburgh, Scotland, when he was 8 years old. He was educated at George Heriot's School, in Edinburgh. He became a mobile DJ in Edinburgh and then joined a local Free Radio Station (Telstar) where his radio career began. Afterwards he went on to join the local stations Radio Forth and Radio Tay at the age of 19 taking over the Radio Tay Breakfast Beat from Gerry Quinn  After progressing through several jobs at stations in Scotland including Radio Clyde in Glasgow and at Metro Radio in the North East of England, he joined BBC Radio 1 in 1987, beginning a 15-year stint with the station, beginning with a two-hour Saturday night show.

BBC Radio 1
Goodier co-presented Radio 1's Weekend Breakfast Show (with Liz Kershaw and Sybil Ruscoe (Kershaw's stand-in), and he quickly progressed to a drivetime slot. He created The Evening Session and hosted it between 1990 and 1993. During this period, he also presented the UK Top 40 chart countdown on Sunday evenings and was also an established host on Top of the Pops, along with several of his BBC Radio 1 colleagues.

Many acclaimed bands and artists recorded sessions for Goodier at the BBC's Maida Vale Studios, some of which were commercially released. In 1992, Nirvana's "odds-and-sods" release, Incesticide, featured several songs recorded for Goodier's BBC show. The album reached the top 40 on both sides of the Atlantic and achieved Platinum status in America. A further session recording was "Something in the Way", released on the 2011 edition of Nevermind.

When Simon Mayo left Radio 1 Breakfast in 1993, former Radio 1 controller Matthew Bannister approached Steve Wright to take over the slot. Wright said that he would not do so immediately after Mayo, and Bannister asked Goodier to host for four months in late 1993. He then shifted to afternoons, then back to his old drivetime slot in 1995. In the same year, he returned to the chart show after Bruno Brookes left the station.

In 1997, Goodier took on a Saturday and Sunday morning slot after quitting daily radio to establish his production company, WiseBuddah. He spent his final two years at Radio 1 only presenting the Top 40 show, before leaving the station entirely in 2002 owing to falling audiences and BBC bosses considering him "too old for the job." Goodier's final show was broadcast on 17 November that year, which also marked the 50th anniversary of the UK Singles Chart. In addition to this, from 2001 Goodier was also frequently heard standing in for presenters on BBC Radio 2 when taking their holiday.

Career after BBC Radio 1
After permanently leaving BBC Radio 1, Goodier presented the EMAP-produced Smash Hits Chart, which competed with Radio 1's official chart and Hit40UK. The Smash Hits Chart finished in March 2006, when EMAP also began to broadcast the Hit40UK chart show across their Big City Network of stations. He also presented the Classical Chart for Classic FM. During this time he was still occasionaly heard covering on BBC Radio 2.

On 1 April 2006, his new Real Top 40 shows began on the Real Radio network in Scotland, Wales and Yorkshire. Every show reflected sales and airplay for that area.

Goodier is featured in a podcast promoting the Top of the Pops boxset alongside Miles Leonard, Malcolm McLaren and David Hepworth.

In March 2007, Goodier joined the newly relaunched Smooth Radio in London, as presenter of the weekday mid-morning show from 10 am to 1 pm, his first daily show in a decade, and subsequently this show was networked to other Smooth stations and then on the national Smooth service. He left the station in December 2012 to focus on running his Wisebuddah company.

Goodier again became a frequent stand-in on BBC Radio 2 when regular presenters are on leave. From 27 February to 2 July 2016 he presented Pick of the Pops on a temporary basis following the dismissal of Tony Blackburn, before Paul Gambaccini took over as the permanent presenter.

In addition, he still is a voiceover artist for television adverts which promote new compact disc-formatted albums, in particular the Now That's What I Call Music! UK series, of which he has been "the voice" since Now 21 in early 1992, along with the exception of Now 95 in November 2016, where he was temporarily replaced by television presenter Matt Edmondson due to Goodier having suffered a stroke around that time. Goodier has also hosted the annual Blackpool Illuminations Switch on Concert for two years on Real Radio and Smooth Radio. In June 2012, Goodier joined Spectrum FM, the English language music station in the Costa del Sol, Spain, to present a weekly Saturday morning show. He is a Fellow of The Radio Academy.

On 17 November 2016, Goodier suffered a stroke aged 55, which prevented him from voicing the official television adverts for Now That's What I Call Music! 95 (UK), which were instead voiced by Matt Edmondson. As of November 2020, he has made "an incredible" recovery and is currently broadcasting on Greatest Hits Radio Monday to Friday as well as Sunday.

References

External links
 
 About WiseBuddah
 The Top 10 at 10 with Mark Goodier on Greatest Hits Radio
 Mark Goodier on Greatest Hits Radio
 Anthems on Greatest Hits Radio
 The Smash Hits Chart Show on Greatest Hits Radio
 Profile at MediaUK
 A brief biography

1961 births
British radio DJs
People educated at George Heriot's School
Living people
BBC Radio 1 presenters
BBC Radio 2 presenters
Top of the Pops presenters